is a railway station on the Ryōmō Line in Ashikaga, Tochigi, Japan, operated by East Japan Railway Company (JR East). The station is named after the nearby Ashikaga Flower Park. The station opened on 1 April 2018.

Lines

Station layout
The station consists of one side platform serving traffic in both directions. The station is unattended.

History
Construction of the new station started in August 2017. The total construction costs of JPY819 million are to be shared between JR East (JPY323 million), Ashikaga City (JPY396 million), and Tochigi Prefecture (JPY100 million).

The name of the new station was announced by JR East in December 2017. The station opened on 1 April 2018.

Surrounding area
 Ashikaga Flower Park
 Kurita Museum

See also
 List of railway stations in Japan

References

External links

  
 JR East news release 

Stations of East Japan Railway Company
Railway stations in Tochigi Prefecture
Railway stations in Japan opened in 2018
Ryōmō Line
Ashikaga, Tochigi